Nathaniel Dana Carlile Hodges (April 19, 1852 – November 25, 1927) was an American librarian. Hodges attended Harvard University, receiving his bachelor's degree in 1874 and his master's degree in 1879. He was appointed to be an assistant in Physics at Harvard University in 1879.  Hodges went on to teach at Worcester Polytechnic Institute from 1882 to 1883 and served as editor of Science Magazine from 1885 to 1894.

He became the Library Director of the  Cincinnati Public Library in 1900 and retired from that position in 1924. Hodges served as the president of the American Library Association from 1909 to 1910. Hodges was named a Notable Ohio Librarians in the Hall of Fame in 1980.

See also
 Cincinnati Public Library

References

External links
 The Public Library System (The Club Woman's Magazine, 1909) p. 6-8

 
 

American librarians
1852 births
1927 deaths
Harvard University alumni
People from Salem, Massachusetts
People from Mount Healthy, Ohio